Scott Rosenberg (born 1959 in Queens, New York is an American journalist, editor, blogger and non-fiction author. He was a co-founder of Salon Media Group and Salon.com and a relatively early participant in The WELL.

Rosenberg's first book, Dreaming in Code appeared in 2007. It offers a detailed perspective on collaboration and massive software endeavors, particularly the open source calendar application Chandler (PIM).

His writings at Salon.com, The San Francisco Examiner and elsewhere have ranged from theatre and film criticism to technology reporting and political commentary.

In 2009, he published a book on the history of blogging, Say Everything.

In 2010 Rosenberg founded MediaBugs.org, a "service for reporting specific, correctable errors and problems in media coverage."  In an interview, he explains, "We'll try to alert the journalists or news organization involved about your report and bring them into a conversation," which may get the error corrected. It is funded by the John S. and James L. Knight Foundation as part of their News Challenge. In September 2012, at the end of the funding period, he explained in a blog post that 'Much of the public sees media-outlet accuracy failures as "not our problem." The journalists are messing up, they believe, and it's the journalists' job to fix things.'

Personal life
Rosenberg is the son of Jeanne and Coleman Rosenberg. He is married to Dayna Macy and has two sons, Matthew and Jack. They live in Berkeley, California.

Further reading

References

External links
 "About Scott Rosenberg and this blog" at Wordyard (wordyard.com)
  Index of Salon articles by Rosenberg – published at Salon.com 1995 to 2006 (archived 2006-10-16)
 , with catalog records
WARNING: As of June 2022, LC credits this Scott Rosenberg ("Browse ... LC Catalog") with some works by the screenwriter born 1963. The same is true at WorldCat.

Webzine writers
American bloggers
American male journalists
American technology writers
Harvard University alumni
San Francisco Examiner people
Writers from Berkeley, California
Living people
1959 births
Date of birth missing (living people)
American male essayists
20th-century American journalists
21st-century American essayists
American male bloggers